The 2022–23 season is the 103rd in the history of Casa Pia A.C. and their first season back in the top flight since 1939. The club will participate in the Primeira Liga, the Taça de Portugal, and the Taça da Liga.

Players

Transfers

Pre-season and friendlies

Competitions

Overall record

Primeira Liga

League table

Results summary

Results by round

Matches 
The league fixtures were announced on 5 July 2022.

Taça de Portugal

Taça da Liga

Group D

References 

Casa Pia A.C.
Casa Pia